Guanosine diphosphate, abbreviated GDP, is a nucleoside diphosphate. It is an ester of pyrophosphoric acid with the nucleoside guanosine. GDP consists of a pyrophosphate group, a pentose sugar ribose, and the nucleobase guanine.

GDP is the product of GTP dephosphorylation by GTPases, e.g., the G-proteins that are involved in signal transduction.

GDP is converted into GTP with the help of pyruvate kinase and phosphoenolpyruvate.

See also
DNA
Guanosine triphosphate
Nucleoside
Nucleotide
Oligonucleotide
RNA

References

Nucleotides
Phosphate esters
Purines
Pyrophosphates